René Jules Lalique (6 April 1860 – 1 May 1945) was a French jeweller, medallist, and glass designer known for his creations of glass art, perfume bottles, vases, jewellery, chandeliers, clocks, and automobile hood ornaments.

Life
Lalique's early life was spent learning the methods of design and art he would use in his later life.  At the age of two, his family moved to the suburbs of Paris, but traveled to Aÿ for summer holidays. These trips influenced Lalique later on in his naturalistic glasswork. With the death of his father, Lalique began working as an apprentice to goldsmith Louis Aucoc in Paris. Lalique died on 1 May or 5 May 1945, in Paris. René Lalique was buried in Père Lachaise Cemetery in Paris, France. His granddaughter, Marie Claude-Lalique (b. 1936), was also a glass maker.  She died on 14 April 2003 in Fort Myers, Florida.

Education
In 1872, when he was twelve, he entered the Collège Turgot, where he started drawing and sketching. He attended evening classes at the Ecole des arts décoratifs. He worked there from 1874 to 1876 and subsequently spent two years at the Crystal Palace School of Art Sydenham, London. During that time, he also practised as an apprentice goldsmith to leading Parisian Art Nouveau jeweller and goldsmith Louis Aucoc. At the Sydenham Art College, his skills for graphic design were improved, and his naturalistic approach to art was further developed.

Art Nouveau jewellery designer
When he returned from England, he worked as a freelance artist, designing pieces of jewellery for French jewelers Cartier, Boucheron, and others.  In 1885, he opened his own business, designed and made his own jewellery and other glass pieces.  After 1895, Lalique also created pieces for Samuel Bing's Paris shop, the  Maison de l'Art Nouveau, which gave Art Nouveau its name.
One of Lalique's major patrons was Calouste Sarkis Gulbenkian, who commissioned more than 140 of his works over nearly 30 years.

Glass maker
Lalique was best known for his creations in glass art. In the 1920s, he became noted for his work in the Art Deco style.
As part of the Art Nouveau style, many of his jewellery pieces and vases showcase plants, flowers and flowing lines.

Works

See also
Art Nouveau in Paris

References
 Unique Lalique Mascots Vol's 1 to 3 by G.G. Weiner

Bibliography
 Bayer, Patricia & Waller, Mark: The Art of René Lalique, Bloomsbury Publishing Ltd, London 1988 
 Dawes, Nicholas M.: Lalique Glass, Crown Publishers, London 1986 
 Elliott, Kelley J. René Lalique: Enchanted by Glass, The Corning Museum of Glass, Corning, New York 2014.  
 Weiner, Geoffrey George Unique Lalique Mascots, The Book Guild Ltd., Brighton 2014 
 Weiner, Geoffrey George " Unique Lalique Mascots" , Grosvenor House Publishing Co.2020 (ISBN  978-1-78623-510-7)
 Weiner, Geoffrey George "Catalogue Raisonne", The Definitive Collector's Guide to Lalique Automobile Mascots (Decorative Hood Ornaments) to be published in May 2025

External links

Rene Lalique Biography at RLalique.com.
Lalique company, with a biography of the artist from the company web site.
 
This is Jersey article on St Matthew's Millbrook, the "Glass Church".
 Musée Lalique official website of French museum entirely about Lalique
 Lalique Museum Doesburg, Dutch museum about René Lalique and contemporaries
 
René Lalique Mascots knowledge base of Rene Lalique bouchons de radiateur (hood ornaments, radiators caps, car mascots)

1860 births
1945 deaths
Art Nouveau designers
Art Deco designers
Burials at Père Lachaise Cemetery
French decorative artists
French glass artists
French jewellery designers
People from Marne (department)